The 1088 papal election subsequent to the death of Pope Victor III in 1087 was held on 12 March 1088. Six cardinal-bishops, assisted by two lower-ranking cardinals, elected Cardinal-Bishop of Ostia Odon de Lagery as the new Pope. He assumed the name Urban II.

Background
Pope Victor III died on 16 September 1087 at Montecassino. Shortly before his death he recommended the election of Cardinal Odon de Lagery as his successor. For six months, the Obedience of Victor III was without a pope. Rome at that time was under control of Antipope Clement III, who was supported by the Emperor Henry IV of Germany, and there was no hope for its quick recovery. In this situation the adherents of Victor III assembled on 9 March 1088 at Terracina, under the protection of the Norman army of Roger I of Sicily, to elect the new pope. Besides the cardinal-bishops, who were the sole electors of the pope, there were present also at the electoral assembly in the cathedral of SS. Pietro e Cesareo the representatives of the two other orders of cardinals, more than 40 bishops and abbots, as well as Benedetto, prefect of Rome and Countess Matilda of Tuscany. Bishop Joannes of Tusculum arose in the midst of the crowded church, and addressed those assembled about the actions of Pope Gregory VII and Pope Victor III de ordinanda ecclesiae, and likewise about the reasons why they were gathered at that place at that time. Then Bishop Joannes of Porto and Benedict the Prefect of the City of Rome arose, and announced that they held powers from the clergy and from the laity of the city in this matter.

Election
The usual three days of fasting and prayer were proclaimed, and the meeting adjourned until Sunday 12 March. On that day the cardinals and the rest of the present churchmen and laymen reassembled in the same church. The bishops of Albano, Tusculum and Porto together proposed the election of Odon de Lagery (Odo de Châtillon), Bishop of Ostia, who had been designated by Victor III. Cardinal Rainerius assented on behalf of the other cardinal-priests. Oderisius of Montecassino spoke for the deacons. Benedict, the Prefect of Rome, spoke for the people of Rome.

Odo accepted his election and took the name Urban II. The name chosen by the new pope after his election was publicly announced by Peter Igneus, Bishop of Albano. On the same day, the new Pope was enthroned and celebrated the inauguration mass. However, it was not until November 1088 that Urban II was able to travel to Rome.

Cardinal-electors
According to the decree of Pope Nicholas II In Nomine Domini (1059), Cardinal-Bishops of the suburbicarian sees were the sole electors of the Pope. In March 1088 there were four or five Cardinal Bishops. The presence of five bishops, including Bruno of Segni, is guaranteed by the letter of the newly elected pope, Urban II, to the archbishop of Salzburg, where he mentions all of the participants in the events at Terracina. A similar, but not identical, letter was sent to the abbot of Cluny.

Other electors

Two Cardinals of non-episcopal rank, one Cardinal-Priest and one Cardinal Deacon assisted at the election:

Notes

References

Bibliography

 Gregoire, Réginald (1965) Bruno di Segni, exégète médiéval et théologien monastique  Spoleto: Centro Italiano di Studi sull'alto Medio Evo: 1965.
 Gregorovius, Ferdinand  (1896). History of Rome in the Middle Ages. Volume IV, Part I. second edition, revised (London: George Bell, 1896). pp. 265–271.
 Huls, Rudolf,  Kardinal, Klerus und Kirchen Roms: 1049-1130 . Tübingen 1977.
H.W. Klewitz, Reformpapsttum und Kardinalskolleg, Darmstadt 1957
I. S. Robinson, The Papacy, 1073-1198: Continuity and Innovation, Cambridge University Press, 1990.

Papal
Papal
Papal
Papal elections
Papal